Malik Devapriya Samarawickrama (born 19 March 1949) is a Sri Lankan entrepreneur and politician. He was appointed to Parliament as a national list member in 2015. He is a former Minister of Development Strategies and International Trade and chairman of the United National Party. 

Educated at Royal College, Colombo, where played at the Bradby Shield Encounter. He also played rugby union for the Ceylonese Rugby & Football Club and represented Sri Lanka in the 1960s. He was a past president of Kandy Sports Club (rugby) and currently is the patron. 

Samaraweera a close friend of Ranil Wickramasinghe was accused of going out the way from the 2015 elected Yahapalana government and playing a role on his own agendas.  In November 2019, he announced his retirement from politics.

References

External links
Sri Lanka Parliament profile

Members of the 15th Parliament of Sri Lanka
Sinhalese businesspeople
United National Party politicians
Sinhalese politicians
Alumni of Royal College, Colombo
Sri Lankan rugby union players
1949 births
Living people